The following is a list of towns in England and Wales which were granted charters of incorporation conferring borough status under the Municipal Corporations Act 1882 or the Local Government Act 1933.

1882–89
Forty-five boroughs were incorporated in this period.  Of this number, more than half (twenty-five) were unreformed boroughs listed in the schedule to the Municipal Corporations Act 1883. This act abolished all such boroughs unless they obtained a new charter by 1886. Among the remaining 21 boroughs most were industrial centres or resorts.  Also incorporated were two county towns: Chelmsford and Taunton, and two areas of suburban London, Croydon and West Ham.

† Listed in the schedule of the Municipal Corporations Act 1883.

1890–99
Twenty-five boroughs were incorporated in 1890s.

1900–09
There were 14 incorporations in the years 1900–1909.  1900 also saw the creation of 28 Metropolitan Boroughs in the County of London by the London Government Act 1899.

1910–19 
There were only seven incorporations in this period.  In fact, the number of boroughs only increased by one, as six boroughs were abolished. Stoke-on-Trent was an amalgam of four boroughs: Burslem, Hanley, Longton and Stoke upon Trent (and two urban districts); Aston Manor was absorbed by Birmingham in 1911; and Devonport by Plymouth in 1914.

1920–29
Eleven boroughs were incorporated in the 1920s.  This only represented a net increase of ten, however as Port Talbot was formed from the merger of the borough of Aberavon and the urban district of Margam.

1930–39
There were fifty-three incorporations of boroughs in this period.

1939–54: a halt to incorporations

The incorporations of Farnworth and Prestwich in 1939 were to be the last for fifteen years.

Initially a halt was put to the creation of new boroughs for the duration of the 1939–1945 war.  The Local Elections and Register of Electors (Temporary Provisions) Act 1939, a piece of emergency war time legislation, provided that no changes could be made to the status or boundaries of local government areas. The legislation was renewed on an annual basis until 1945.

With the ending of hostilities a Local Government Boundary Commission was appointed in October 1945 to review the entire structure of local administration. While the review was being held, no petitions for incorporation were made.

The commission was abolished without completing its work in 1949, and following a change of government in 1951, new applications for incorporation were again accepted.

1954–55
Nine towns were incorporated in the years 1954 and 1955.

1956–74

The only new municipal boroughs were created by amalgamation of existing corporations in this period.  In fact there was a decrease in the number of municipalities as various local government changes were made.
In 1961 the boroughs of Huntingdon and Godmanchester were merged.
In 1965 forty-two boroughs (including three county boroughs) were abolished when they were constituted part of Greater London. These were: Acton, Barking, Barnes, Beckenham, Beddington and Wallington, Bexley, Brentford and Chiswick, Bromley, Chingford, Croydon CB, Dagenham, Ealing, East Ham CB, Edmonton, Enfield, Erith, Finchley, Harrow, Hendon, Heston and Isleworth, Hornsey, Ilford, Kingston upon Thames, Leyton, Malden and Coombe, Mitcham, Richmond (Surrey), Romford, Southall, Southgate, Surbiton, Sutton and Cheam, Tottenham, Twickenham, Uxbridge, Walthamstow, Wanstead and Woodford, Wembley, West Ham CB, Willesden, Wimbledon and Wood Green.
In 1966 six boroughs in the Black Country were abolished: Bilston, Oldbury, Rowley Regis, Smethwick, Tipton, Wednesbury, while the new county borough of Warley was created.
In 1967 the borough of Torquay was absorbed by the new county borough of Torbay, while six boroughs were merged with rural districts to become "rural boroughs".  The boroughs involved were Bishop's Castle, Bridgnorth, Lostwithiel, Ludlow, Much Wenlock and Oswestry.  The county borough of West Hartlepool merged with the non-county borough of Hartlepool to form a new county borough of Hartlepool.
In 1968 Queenborough became part of the larger borough of Queenborough-in-Sheppey, and Fowey part of the borough of St. Austell with Fowey.  The new county borough of Teesside absorbed the four boroughs of Middlesbrough, Redcar, Stockton-on-Tees and Thornaby-on-Tees. The borough of South Molton was also absorbed into the rural district of the same name.

Unsuccessful petitions for incorporation
In order for a town to be incorporated as a borough, a petition was submitted to the privy council for consideration. Although the majority of petitions were successful, a number of applications were not. Petitions seeking incorporation were recorded in The London Gazette, and the following is a list of petitions listed in the Gazette in the period 1882 to 1955 that did not lead to the grant of a charter:

The 1955 petition by Woking was the last application before reorganisation of local government in 1965 and 1974.

References

Local government in the United Kingdom
Boroughs of the United Kingdom